Minuscule 640 (in the Gregory-Aland numbering), Οπρ 262 (von Soden), is a Greek minuscule manuscript of the New Testament, on parchment. Palaeographically to the 11th century. The manuscript is very fragmentary. Scrivener labeled it by 230a, Gregory by 203a.

Description
The codex contains the text of the Epistle of James 1:1-23 on 2 parchment leaves (size ). The text is written in one column per page, 17 lines per page for biblical text, and 37-45 lines per page for a commentary. The manuscript is of wonderful beauty.

Text
The Greek text of the codex is a representative of the Byzantine text-type. Kurt Aland placed it in Category V.

History
The manuscript is dated by the INTF to the 11th century.

The manuscript was presented by Harris from Alexandria to the British Museum. The manuscript was added to the list of New Testament manuscripts by Scrivener (230a) and Gregory (203a). Gregory saw the manuscript in 1883. In 1908 Gregory gave the number 640 to it.

The manuscript currently is housed at the British Library (Add MS 19392A).

See also

List of New Testament minuscules
Biblical manuscript
Textual criticism

References

Further reading

Greek New Testament minuscules
11th-century biblical manuscripts
British Library additional manuscripts